Rachel Chalkowski (born 1939) is an Israeli midwife and a gemach organizer. Widely known as Bambi, she is a Haredi Jew, and is married to Rabbi Moshe Chalkowski, founding principal of Neve Yerushalayim College for Women. She worked for over 43 years as a midwife at the Shaare Zedek Medical Center in Jerusalem, and set up a charitable foundation to help impoverished Haredi families.

Biography
She was born Rachel Bamberger in Paris in 1939, and had one sister and one brother, the latter being born after their father was taken prisoner by the Nazi-allied government in 1944; her father was deported to his death in the Auschwitz concentration camp. Always determined to become a nurse, she emigrated to Israel at age 15 to live with relatives in Haifa, and attended Bais Yaakov High School before enrolling as a student nurse at Shaare Zedek Medical Center in Jerusalem. After completing her nurse's training, she took a midwifery course, and embarked on her life-long career. She worked at Shaare Zedek Medical Center for 43 years, becoming Head Midwife, and delivering more than 35,000 babies. After retiring from her full-time post at Shaare Zedek, she continued to work there for two nights each week. She asserts that: "Being a midwife is the most beautiful career in the world."

Matan B'Seter Bambi
Noting the poverty of many new mothers from the Haredi sector, who often have large families and must help support them, Chalkowski established a foundation in 1973 called Matan B'Seter Bambi, named after Chalkowski's nickname from her days as a student nurse, when it had been necessary to give nicknames to several students all named Rachel. The foundation has an annual budget of about USD$1 million, has 35 branches across North America and Europe, and is coordinated by volunteers in New York. It supports over 400 needy families monthly.

Documentary
Chalkowski and Haredi educator Adina Bar-Shalom are featured in the 2009 documentary film Haredim: The Rabbi's Daughter and the Midwife.

Personal
She is married to Rabbi Moshe Chalkowski, founding principal of Neve Yerushalayim College for Women. The couple have an adopted daughter, Michal, and two grandsons.

References

French emigrants to Israel
20th-century French Jews
Israeli Orthodox Jews
Israeli midwives
Shaare Zedek Medical Center
1939 births
Living people